David Simon (born 1960) is an American journalist, novelist and TV writer.

David Simon may also refer to:

 David Simon (basketball) (born 1982), American basketball player
 David Simon (CEO) (born 1961/1962), CEO of Simon Property Group
 David Simon (rower) (born 1979), American Olympic rower
 David Simon, Baron Simon of Highbury (born 1939), British businessman
 David Simon, 3rd Viscount Simon (born 1940), British peer
David Simon (art historian)

See also

David Simons (disambiguation)